Lendeh (also Romanized as Lendeh; also known as Lindeh and Lindsh) is a city in and the capital of Lendeh County, in Kohgiluyeh and Boyer-Ahmad Province, Iran. At the 2006 census, its population was 10,540, in 1,991 families.

References

Populated places in Landeh County

Cities in Kohgiluyeh and Boyer-Ahmad Province